Saturday AM is an ongoing English-written international shōnen manga anthology magazine founded in Morrisville, North Carolina in 2013 by Frederick L. Jones and published by MyFutprint Entertainment. The magazine is presented as "the world's most diverse manga anthology".

Publication history 
Frederick L. Jones from the United States, who has been an executive in video game industry, founded MyFutprint Entertainment in 2013 to assist in developing and marketing new manga concepts for creators from around the world.

MyFutprint published the magazine Saturday AM with series like Apple Black from Nigeria, Saigami from Hungary, and Bully Eater and Clock Striker from the United States, becoming an alternate option to the Jump magazines from Japan.

Staff 
 Deyan Turlachevic
 Frederick L. Jones
 Jey Odin
 Morgan Walker
 Odunze Oguguo / Whyt Manga
 Oscar Fong
 Rashad Millhouse
 Raymond Brown
 Seny Doney

Other magazines 

 Fan Art Friday
 Saturday Afternoon
 Saturday Brunch
 Saturday Plus
 Saturday PM
 Saturday Retro
 Super Saturday

List of titles

Saturday AM (main line) 

 Apple Black
 Atlas Article
 Better Off Ignorant
 Bully Eater
 Clock Striker
 Comet Man
 Crunch Time
 Hammer
 The Massively Multiplayer World of Ghosts
 Metal Souls
 Orisha
 Paradise Down
 Protect, Marry, Kill
 Saigami
 Soul Beat
 Spoon
 Titan King
 Tortuga Force 5

Saturday Afternoon 

 Benedict Nick the Phenomenal Brick
 Boneyard
 Change The World
 Dream State
 Happily Ever After
 In This Life
 October Legion
 Reaper, Inc.

Saturday Brunch 

 Gunhild
 Grimmheim
 Killshot
 Henshin
 Otherworldly Travel Agency
 Zephyr

Saturday PM 

 4Strikes
 Bacassi
 Deaddie Du Dead
 Code Name: Villain
 Oblivion Rouge
 Outland
 Revolver Kiss
 Underground
 Yellow Stringer

Super Saturday 

 Saturday Wars

Other media

Podcast 

 Saturday Daily
Saturday FM

Video games 

 Flick Solitaire (by Flick Games)
 Saturday AM: Webcomic Rumble (by Marmot Media)

References

External links 

 Official website

Magazines established in 2013
Shōnen manga magazines